The Missouri Tigers softball team represents the University of Missouri in NCAA Division I college softball.  The team is coached by head coach Larissa Anderson, who was hired on May 26, 2018.

History

Early history (1975–1987)
In response to the passage of Title IX in 1972, Missouri began sponsoring women's softball, women's basketball, and women's track & field, women's swimming, women's volleyball, women's tennis, women's golf, and women's field hockey during the 1974–1975 academic year. Alexis Jarrett was the first women's softball coach at Missouri, also coaching the women's basketball (1974–1975) and women's track and field teams (including cross-country) from 1974–1977 while serving as the women's assistant director of athletics (1974–1976) and sports information director for the eight women's sports (1974-1977). Jarrett would have success, going 14–7 in both years at the helm for a .667 win percentage and finishing 2nd in the 1975 and 1976 AIAW State Championship. The 1975 team also finished sixth in the unofficial Big Eight Championship held at Kansas State.

For the next four years, Missouri would continue to have moderate success under head coach Debbie Duren, peaking in 1980 with a 2nd place finish in the Big 8 Tournament and a 5th place finish in the AIAW Region 6 Championship.

Barb Preist took over as head coach in 1981 and led Missouri to greater heights, including a 5th place finish in its first appearance in the Women's College World Series in 1981. In 1982, Preist led Missouri to an appearance in Mideast Regional in the inaugural NCAA Division I tournament.

Joyce Compton took over for Preist after the 1982 season and in her first season as head coach led Missouri to its first Big 8 Tournament Championship and to its second appearance in the Women's College World Series. The 1980–1983 teams were led by Missouri's all-time wins and shutouts leader and 1983 All-America Teresa Wilson. After Wilson's departure, Compton was unable to build off of that 1983 season, failing to reach the NCAA Tournament in each of her next three years before accepting the head coach position at the University of South Carolina. Compton was replaced for one season by Rhesa Sumrell, under whom Missouri would suffer their only losing season between 1979 and 2002. Missouri has had only three losing seasons (1978, 1979 and 1987).

The Miller era (1988–2002)
Jay Miller was brought in as Missouri's 6th head coach in 1988. After three years of a fair amount of success, the Tigers had a breakout year in 1991 behind All-American pitcher Karen Snelgrove, winning both the Big 8 Championship and Big 8 Tournament Championship and reaching the WCWS for the third time in school history.  Anchored by sluggers Mary Babb and Barb Wright, Miller would go on to lead Missouri to its fourth WCWS appearance in 1994, as well as Missouri's first Big 12 Championship in 1997. All in all, in his 15 years as head coach, 10 different Missouri players would earn All-American honors under Miller.

The Singleton years (2003–2006)
Ty Singleton took over as head coach in 2003. Missouri had moderate success under Singleton, earning three straight trips to the NCAA Tournament from 2003–2005 but failing to make it past the Regional stage and unable to win any conference championships. Singleton did earn Big 12 Coach of the Year honors in 2003 but ultimately was let go in 2006 following just Missouri's third losing season since 1979.

The Earleywine legacy (2007–2018)
In 2007, Missouri lured Jefferson City native and 2005 ACC Coach of the Year Ehren Earleywine away from the Georgia Tech Yellow Jackets. Earleywine would earn Big 12 Coach of the Year honors in his first season and again in 2011.

In 2008, in winning the Iowa City Regional, Earlywhine led Missouri to its first ever Super Regional appearance, where the Tigers fell to the Alabama Crimson Tide. In 2009, Missouri would win the Big 12 Tournament and defeat the UCLA Bruins en route to the 2009 Women's College World Series, Missouri's first WCWS appearance since 1994. Missouri would host a Super Regional for the first time in 2010, defeating the Oregon Ducks to advance to the 2010 Women's College World Series. In 2011, Missouri won the Big 12 Championship for the second time and defeated the Washington Huskies on the way to the 2011 Women's College World Series, Missouri's third consecutive trip. In Missouri's last season as a member of the Big 12 in 2012, Missouri fell just short of a fourth consecutive WCWS appearance, losing to the LSU Tigers in the Super Regionals.

From 2008–2013, Earleywine led Missouri to six straight Super Regionals. From 2009–2011, Earleywine led Missouri to back-to-back-to-back WCWS appearances.

In seven seasons under Earleywine, six different players have earned All-American honors and three players, Rhea Taylor (2008, 2010, 2011), Ashley Fleming (2011, 2012), and Chelsea Thomas (2011, 2012, 2013), have earned multiple All-American honors. Thomas won conference pitcher of the year honors three times (twice in the Big 12, once in the SEC) and was a Top 3 finalist for USA Softball Player of the Year honors in 2011.

Earleywine was fired from Missouri on January 26, 2018, less than two weeks before the 2018 regular season was set to begin. Gina Fogue replaced Earleywine as head coach on an interim basis; she led the Tigers to a 30-29 record during the 2018 season, but was not retained following the year.

The Anderson tenure (2018–present)
Larissa Anderson was hired as the Tiger’s head softball coach on May 26, 2018. Anderson signed a five-year contract with Missouri after spending four years as the head coach at Hofstra.

Head coaches

Year-by-year results

Missouri in the NCAA Tournament

Individual awards
Missouri has had numerous players earn national or conference honors.

All Americans

 1980
Lisa Burke
 1983
Karen Sweet
Teresa Wilson
 1986
Kris Schmidt
 1990
Karen Snelgrove
 1995
Karen Persinger
 1997
Mary Babb
Barb Wright

 1998
Wendy Harrison
 1999
Kim Slover
 2000
Stacy Gerneinhardt
 2001
Erin Erickson
Melanie Fisher
Karen Williams
 2003
Rachel McGinnis
 2008
Rhea Taylor

 2009
Marla Schweisberger
Rhea Taylor
Lindsey Ubrun
 2011
Ashley Fleming
Rhea Taylor
Chelsea Thomas
 2012
Ashley Fleming
Chelsea Thomas
 2013
Chelsea Thomas
 2014
Taylor Gadbois
 2016
Emily Crane
 2016
Sami Fagan

All Women's College World Series
 2010
Rhea Taylor
 2011
Chelsea Thomas

National awards

NFCA Golden Shoe Award'''
Taylor Gadbois – 2014

Conference awards
Big 12 Player of the Year
Barb Wright – 1997

Big 12 Pitcher of the Year
Chelsea Thomas – 2011, 2012

Big 12 Freshman of the Year
Rhea Taylor – 2008

Big 12 Defensive Player of the Year
Megan Christopher – 2011
Corrin Genovese – 2012

Big 12 Coach of the Year
Jay Miller – 1997
Ty Singleton – 2003
Ehren Earleywine – 2007, 2011

SEC Pitcher of the Year
Chelsea Thomas – 2013

SEC Freshman of the Year
Tori Finucane – 2014

See also
 List of NCAA Division I softball programs

References

External links